The Ambassador of the United Kingdom to Norway is the United Kingdom's foremost diplomatic representative in Norway, and head of the UK's diplomatic mission in Norway.  The official title is His Britannic Majesty's Ambassador to the Kingdom of Norway. Norway and the United Kingdom have exchanged diplomats since Norway became independent, when Sir Arthur Herbert was appointed British Minister to Norway on 27 October 1905.

England, and later the United Kingdom, has had a diplomatic and/or consular representation in Norway at least since the 17th century.

List of heads of mission

Ministers to Norway
1905–1910: Sir Arthur Herbert, G.C.V.O.
1911–1923: Sir Mansfeldt Findlay, G.B.E., K.C.M.G.
1923–1929: Rt. Hon. Sir Francis Lindley, G.C.M.G., C.B., C.B.E.
1929–1934: Sir Charles Wingfield, K.C.M.G.
1934–1942: Sir Cecil Dormer, K.C.M.G.

Ambassador to the Norwegian Government in Exile
1942–1945: Sir Laurence Collier, K.C.M.G.

Ambassadors to Norway
1945–1951: Sir Laurence Collier, K.C.M.G.
1951–1955: Sir Michael Wright, G.C.M.G.
1955–1960: Sir Peter Scarlett, K.C.M.G., K.C.V.O.
1961–1962: Sir John Walker, K.C.M.G.
1963–1965: Sir Patrick Hancock, G.C.M.G.
1965–1968: Sir Ian Dixon Scott, K.C.M.G., K.C.V.O., C.I.E.
1968–1972: Frank Brenchley, C.M.G.
1972–1975: Ralph Selby, C.M.G.
1975–1977: Sir Peter Scott, K.B.E., C.M.G.
1978–1980: Sir Archie Lamb, K.B.E., C.M.G., D.F.C.
1981–1983: Dame Gillian Brown, D.C.V.O., C.M.G.
1983–1987: Sir William Bentley, K.C.M.G.
1987–1990: Sir John Robson, K.C.M.G.
1990–1994: Sir David Ratford, K.C.M.G., C.V.O.
1994–1998: Mark Elliott, C.M.G.
1998–2002: Sir Richard Dales, K.C.V.O., C.M.G.
2002–2006: Mariot Leslie, C.M.G.
2006–2010: David Powell
2010–2014: Jane Owen
2014–2018: Sarah Gillett

2018–: Richard Wood

British consuls in Oslo
1686–? Daniel Butts, honorary
1834–1844 George Mygind, honorary
1844–? Sir John Rice Crowe (consul-general), honorary
1906-1910 Francis Edward Drummond Hay
1926–1931 Christopher Lintrup Paus, C.B.E.

References

External links
UK and Norway, gov.uk

Norway
 
United Kingdom